Abdul Rahman is an Indian politician, Chairman of Tamil Nadu Wakf Board and Former Member of the Parliament of India from Vellore Constituency, Tamil Nadu. He represents the Indian Union Muslim League party. IUML and DMK both are friendly parties in Tamil Nadu state, so he represented in DMK election symbol.

ADR and India Today combined survey has revealed Abdul Rahman placed in Sixth Rank among Top 20 MPs of the 15th Loksabha in all respects.

Early life
Abdul Rahman was born in Muthupet, Tiruvarur, Tamil Nadu on 28 May 1959. Abdul Rahman is post graduate in Economics from Jamal Mohamed College, Tiruchrappalli. Prior to that he did Diploma in Computer Programming from Institute of Business Applications, Chennai.

Special Interests
According to the official portal of the Indian Government, the National Portal of India, Rahman describes his special interests as "Working for peace in society; inculcating ethical and spiritual values among the people and striving for communal harmony; spreading the study of comparative religion; to work for harmony of hearts and meeting of minds of our people in different cultures and to see India as the prosperous blissful land of peace".

Posts Held

Other Position and Awards
President, Quaide Millath Forum, Chennai; Vice-President, : (i) The Bank and (ii) Indian Muslim Association, U.A.E.; Founder Member of Indian Community Welfare Committee of Indian Consulate, Dubai; awarded, (i) "Outstanding Personality in Keeping Communal Harmony" award by Tamil Sangam; (ii) Personality award for communal amity conferred by Jamal Mohamed College, Tiruchirappalli, Tamil Nadu; (iii) first prize in State level elocution competition during school and college education

References

External links 
 https://web.archive.org/web/20120305171654/http://indianunionmuslimleague.in/abdul_rahman
 https://web.archive.org/web/20120505220458/http://india.gov.in/govt/loksabhampbiodata.php?mpcode=4537
 https://web.archive.org/web/20130309004632/http://www.mpmla.in/mp.php?stcode=S22&pcno=7
 http://www.abroadindians.com/news/br-a-abdul-rahman-member-of-indian-parliament-brief-visit-to-state-of-kuwait/303
 https://picasaweb.google.com/107459669457968807598/AbdulRahmanMPVellore?authuser=0&feat=directlink

1959 births
Living people
India MPs 2009–2014
Lok Sabha members from Tamil Nadu
Indian Union Muslim League politicians
People from Muthupet
Jamal Mohamed College alumni
People from Vellore district